The Harold Brown Award is the highest award given by the United States Air Force to a scientist or engineer who applies scientific research to solve a problem critical to the needs of the Air Force.

History and purpose

The Harold Brown Award is intended to recognize significant achievements in research and development. It is named for Harold Brown, a physicist who served as United States Secretary of the Air Force  from 1965-1969, and later as United States Secretary of Defense (1977-1981).

The Harold Brown award is presented annually to a person whose achievements in research and development have led to, or demonstrated promise of, a substantial improvement in the operational effectiveness of the Air Force. It is awarded through the United States Air Force chief scientist's office.

The winner of the award receives a brass medallion set in a block of Lucite and a certificate signed by the Secretary of the Air Force and the Chief of Staff of the Air Force. The name of the winner is also engraved on a plaque near the office of the Secretary of the Air Force and he or she may also wear the Air Force Recognition Ribbon (military) or Air Force Recognition Lapel Pin (civilian) as appropriate.

List of recipients

Recipients of the Harold Brown Award include:

See also 

 List of general science and technology awards 
 List of engineering awards
 List of physics awards
 List of space technology awards

References

Aerospace engineering awards
Physics awards
Space-related awards
Awards established in 1969